Tim Murray (born November 14, 1974) is a Canadian former professional ice hockey defenceman.

Career
Murray attended the University of New Hampshire where he played four seasons (1993–1997) of NCAA Division I men's ice hockey with the New Hampshire Wildcats of the Hockey East conference. He was recognized for his outstanding play when in his freshman year he was named to the 1993–94 Hockey East All-Rookie Team, and in his senior year was awarded with the Roger A. Leclerc Trophy as the team's MVP and named to the NCAA East All-American Second Team.

Immediately after graduation in 1997, Murray began his professional career with the Detroit Vipers of the International Hockey League (IHL). He went on to play three years of professional hockey, retiring after the 1999–2000 season having played 78 games in the IHL, 61 games in the American Hockey League, and 40 regular season games in the British Ice Hockey Superleague with the London Knights.

Career Statistics

Regular Season and Playoffs

Awards and honours

References

External links

1974 births
Living people
Adirondack Red Wings players
Canadian ice hockey defencemen
Detroit Vipers players
London Knights (UK) players
New Hampshire Wildcats men's ice hockey players
Portland Pirates players
Rochester Americans players
Ice hockey people from Calgary
Canadian expatriate ice hockey players in England
AHCA Division I men's ice hockey All-Americans